PSKD Mandiri is a school located in Menteng, Central Jakarta. It was founded in July 1996 as part of the Association of Djakarta Christian Schools. PSKD Mandiri teaches the national curriculum with an international approach. PSKD Mandiri is associated with The Leader in Me Program.

Campus
The campus is located in Jl. DR. GSSY Ratulangi no.5 (EC, TK and SD) and no. 14 (SMP and SMA) Menteng.

Facilities
The school facilities include air-conditioned classrooms with internet access, an Information Technology Room, a kitchen corner, a library with a collection of books and CD ROMs, science laboratories, a music room, and a gymnasium which also serves as the multipurpose hall. The school hospital is quite small, but has a large corridor. The school also has a creative art room which is used during the open house where they sell drawings and paintings of creativity that every children has. 
students facilities:
- teacher's lounge
- student's lounge
- snack bars
- libraries

Student body
The school has a student body only in Junior High School and High School levels. Student Body's are Sports (includes soccer, badminton, swimming, and basketball), Music, Journalism (includes photography and news coverage), Dance, Going Green, and Community Service. Once a year we have a competition called "the lead project". Students must participate for the internal competition but for the external competition students from other school may join us.

Uniform
The students of EC, TK and SD wear purple batik shirt and purple shorts, while the SMP and SMA students use green batik shirts and dark blue trousers.

Types of tests
At the end of a semester (usually November/May), students from grades 2-12 take semester tests. For grades 6, 9 and 12 they have extra tests, such as try out, practical, national and school final exams. Grades 3, 5, 7 and 9 will also take the SUS test, the International Schools Assessments.

Schools in Indonesia
Schools in Jakarta